Elizabeth Yates McGreal (December 6, 1905 – July 29, 2001) was an American writer. She may have been known best for the biographical novel Amos Fortune, Free Man, winner of the 1951 Newbery Medal. She had been a Newbery runner-up in 1944 for Mountain Born. She began her writing career as a journalist, contributing travel articles to The Christian Science Monitor and The New York Times. Many of her books were illustrated by the British artist Nora S. Unwin.

Yates wrote a three-volume autobiography: My Diary – My World (1981), My Widening World (1983), and One Writer's Way (1984).

Early years and education

Elizabeth Yates was born in Buffalo, New York, the daughter of Harry and Mary Duffy Yates. She was the seventh of eight children. Her father owned a plantation. She had a love of animals and the land, which stemmed from her childhood experiences.

She attended Franklin School, graduating in 1924. Yates then spent a year at Oaksmere, a private school near New York City, founded by mathematician Winifred Edgerton Merrill. 

Books were an important part of her life. Yates credited her mother for instilling in her a love for books by reading aloud to the family. At the age of 12, at the request of her father, Yates read through the whole Bible. This was to become one of her favorite books. Her sister also encouraged her to read, and made a list of recommended books for Elizabeth.

From an early age, Yates enjoyed writing. In her childhood, she transformed an unused pigeon loft on the family farm into a secret writing place.

Career
After her schooling was finished, she moved to Manhattan and began writing book reviews and newspaper articles. In 1929, she married William Henry and the couple moved to England, where they lived for the next 10 years. In 1938, her first book, High Holiday, was an adult novel set in the Swiss Alps.

The couple returned to the United States in 1939, and settled in Peterborough, New Hampshire. They bought a farm, and a discovery of old artwork during the restoration of the farmhouse prompted Yates to write Patterns on the Wall. Personal experience formed the basis of many of Yates' novels. Her passion for the land led her to write The Road Through Sandwich Notch, a book which was influential in preserving that portion of New Hampshire for inclusion in the White Mountain National Forest.

Yates conducted writer's workshops at the University of New Hampshire, the University of Connecticut, and Indiana University. She also served as the Director of the New Hampshire Association for the Blind.

Yates was widowed in 1963. She died at a hospice in Concord, New Hampshire on July 29, 2001, at the age of 95.

Recognition
In 1943, Patterns on the Wall received the Herald Tribune Award. Yates' novel, Amos Fortune, Free Man, received the Newbery Medal, the inaugural William Allen White Children's Book Award, and the Herald Tribune Award. Mountain Born received a Newbery Honor in 1944, while in 1955 Rainbow Round the World received the Jane Addams Children's Book Award from the Women's International League for Peace and Freedom.

In 1970, she was given the Sarah Josepha Hale Award "in recognition of a distinguished body of work in the field of literature and letters".

In the 1990s, the New Hampshire Association for the Blind began the William and Elizabeth Yates McGreal Society. Yates had been a previous President of the Board, while her husband was the Association's first Executive Director.

In 1994, the Concord, New Hampshire Public Library created the Elizabeth Yates Award to honor an individual in the greater Concord area who is actively engaged in inspiring young people to read.

Elizabeth Yates' books have been described as "the result of extensive research, a strong underlying belief in God, and a vivid imagination."

List of works

High Holiday, London: A.C. Black, 1938
Climbing Higher, an Iceland Adventure, London: A.C. Black, 1938
Hans and Frieda in the Swiss Mountains, Wide World storybook series, New York: Thomas Nelson, 1939
Haven for the Brave, New York: Knopf, 1941
Around the Year in Iceland (illustrated by Jon Nielson), Boston: Heath, 1942 (New World Neighbors)
Under the Little Fir, and other stories (illustrated by Nora S. Unwin) New York: Coward–McCann, 1942
Patterns on the Wall, New York: Knopf, 1943. Rpt. as The Journeyman, South Carolina: JourneyForth, 1990
Mountain Born (illustrated by Nora S. Unwin), New York: Coward–McCann, 1943
Wind of Spring, New York: Coward–McCann, 1945
Nearby, New York: Coward–McCann, 1947
Beloved Bondage, New York: Coward–McCann, 1948
Amos Fortune, Free Man New York: Aladdin, 1950
Brave Interval, New York: Coward–McCann, 1952
Prudence Crandall: Woman of Courage, Boyds Mills Press, 1955.
Pebble in a Pool: The Widening Circle of Dorothy Canfield Fisher's Life New York: Dutton, 1958
 The Road Through Sandwich Notch, Stephen Greene Press, 1973, (Illustrated by Nora Spicer Unwin).
 The Lighted Heart (Illustrated by Nora S. Unwin), New York: Dutton, 1960; Dublin, NH: William L. Bauhan, 1974
 The Next Fine Day, (illustrated by Nora S. Unwin), New York: The John Day Company, 1962
Howard Thurman: Portrait of a Practical Dreamer, New York: The John Day Company, 1964
 Is There a Doctor in the Barn: A Day in the Life of Forrest F. Tenney, Veterinarian, New York: Dutton, 1966; Dublin, NH: William L. Bauhan, 1977
With Pipe, Paddle and Song: A Story of the French-Canadian Voyageurs circa 1750 (Illustrated by Nora S. Unwin), New York: Dutton, 1968
 On That Night, (illustrated by James Barkley), New York: Dutton, 1969 (excerpted in Reader's Digest, Dec. 1969)
Skeezer: Dog With a Mission,  New York: Harvey House, 1973 (made into a 1983 film)
 Call It Zest: The Vital Ingredient After Seventy, Brattleboro, VT: The Stephen Greene Press, 1977
 Autobiography:
 My Diary – My World, Philadelphia: Westminster Press, 1981
 My Widening World, Philadelphia: Westminster Press, 1983
 One Writer's Way, Philadelphia: Westminster Press, 1984
Sound Friendships; the story of Willa and her hearing ear dog, Woodstock, VT: The Countryman Press, 1987
Spanning Time: A diary keeper becomes a writer Carolyn P. Yoder, ed., Peterborough, NH: Cobblestone Pub., 1996
Open the Door; a gathering of poems and prose pieces, Hopkinton, NH: New Hampshire Antiquarian Society, 1999

"Someday You'll Write", New York: E.P. Dutton & Co, 1962, Library of Congress Catalog Card Number: 62-14706

Compiled or edited

Gathered Grace, a short selection of G. MacDonald's Poems, Cambridge: W. Heffer and Sons, 1938
Enys Tregarthen, Piskey Folk: A Book of Cornish Legends, New York: Day, 1940
Enys Tregarthen, The Doll Who Came Alive, New York: Day, 1940Joseph, the King James version of a well-loved tale, New York: Knopf, 1947
Enys Tregarthen, The White Ring, New York: Harcourt, 1949 The Christmas Story, New York: Alladin, 1949Your Prayers and Mine, Boston: Houghton, 1954
George MacDonald, Sir Gibbie, New York: Dutton, 1963

 

References

Further reading
 
 Trudell PM, Margaret. Elizabeth Yates: A Biography and Bibliography of Her Works'' (Authorhouse, 2003)

External links
  (mainly as 'Yates, Elizabeth, 1905–', previous page of browse report)

1905 births
2001 deaths
American children's writers
American women novelists
Newbery Medal winners
Newbery Honor winners
Writers from Buffalo, New York
People from Peterborough, New Hampshire
Novelists from New Hampshire
American women children's writers
20th-century American women writers
20th-century American novelists
Novelists from New York (state)